Episcopal Church of the Good Shepherd may refer to:

Episcopal Church of the Good Shepherd (Berkeley, California), listed on the NRHP in California
Church of the Good Shepherd (Lake Charles, Louisiana), also known as Episcopal Church of the Good Shepherd, listed on the NRHP in Louisiana
Church of the Good Shepherd-Episcopal (Blue Earth, Minnesota), listed on the NRHP in Minnesota
Episcopal Church of the Good Shepherd (Binghamton, New York), sold in 2011 to a mosque
The Church of the Good Shepherd (Raleigh, North Carolina), historic Episcopal Church
Episcopal Church of the Good Shepherd (Ogden, Utah), listed on the NRHP in Utah

de:Gut-Hirten-Kirche